Paul Puustusmaa (born on 5 September 1964 in Kuressaare) is an Estonian lawyer and politician. He has been member of XIV Riigikogu.

In 1992 he graduated from University of Tartu in law speciality.

1992-1998 he was a lawyer in the company AS Raidman. 2005-2008 he worked at the company AS YIT Ehitus, being the head of the legal department.

Since 2012 he is a member of Estonian Conservative People's Party.

References

1964 births
20th-century Estonian lawyers
21st-century Estonian lawyers
Conservative People's Party of Estonia politicians
Living people
Members of the Riigikogu, 2019–2023
People from Kuressaare
University of Tartu alumni